The Indigenous Authorities of Colombia (AICO) is a progressive indigenist political party in Colombia.

The Movement of Indigenous Authorities of Colombia was recognized as a Colombian political party on August 15, 1991. It is the political, social and cultural movement of the indigenous authorities of Colombia, born from the struggle for land and the defense of the rights of indigenous peoples and since the 1991 constitution has been participating in the political life of the country. It proposes a model and operation from the principles of territoriality, autonomy, identity, cultural preservation, participation, diversity and interculturality, manifested in Colombian society and the international relations of indigenous peoples. Its current only congressman is the senator for the indigenous constituency Manuel Bitervo Palchucan Chingal.

History
In 1971 the Regional Indigenous Council of Cauca (CRIC) was born, constituted from the cabildos as authorities of the Indigenous Reservations, to assert the rights to land, culture and autonomy. In 1978 the Misak people held a great assembly known as "First Assembly of the Guambiano people", in which they claimed their autonomy as a people, greater rights, proper and original, as well as the minga (community work), and proclaimed the manifesto "ikpe namui ken ñimmerá". They decided to withdraw from the CRIC because they considered its structure to be of a "trade union, too alien and poorly adapted to indigenous communities and authorities". They then formed the Indigenous Authorities of Southwestern Colombia (AISO).

They held the first "March of Indigenous Authorities" in 1980, under the slogan: "Recover the land to recover everything: Authority, Autonomy and Culture". They rejected the repression against the indigenous movement, violence and the "Indigenous Statute" issued by the government of Julio César Turbay Ayala. In 1983 they recovered the Hacienda Las Mercedes in Silvia.

In 1987 they held the second march. Together with indigenous councils of the Pastos and Camsá and authorities of the Tairona Indigenous Confederation, they created the Indigenous Authorities Movement of Colombia  that pronounced itself for "the political, economic, social, ecological reconstruction and recovery of the cultural values of the native peoples".

The oral tradition arises in the southwest of Colombia with the unification of the Guambianos and Pastos peoples, in the departments of Cauca and Nariño under the defense and conception of the Major Law, for the recovery of territory and the defense of the titles awarded by the Spanish crown (Amparos, possessions, provisions, royal cedula, obedience, decrees, and agreements of reservations of colonial origin) as an original title of collective territorial property.

In 1987 the Organization of Indigenous Authorities of the Southwestern Colombia took on its current name, and is currently made up of councils and / or indigenous authorities of a large part of the Colombian territory.

Political participation
In 1990, when the Constituent Assembly was convened, AICO decided to express itself as a political movement and launch its own list that was successful in the election of Lorenzo Muelas, with outstanding performance during the Assembly sessions in 1991. Later, it participated in elections to the Congress of the Republic, electing in past periods as senators Floro Tunubalá, who was later governor of Cauca and Efrén Tara later, and representatives Narciso Jamioy and Lorenzo Almendra. In the elections of March 12, 2006, Ramiro Estacio was elected leader of the indigenous people of the Pastos.

External links

 Facebook page

Indigenist political parties in South America
Political parties in Colombia
Progressive parties in Colombia